A was the name of a Early Dynastic pharaoh of Ancient Egypt. His name is known from a graffito serekh carved into a sandstone outcropping 10 to 12 kilometers southwest of Umm el-Dabadib at the Kharga Oasis in the Western Desert. The presence of the serekh shows evidence of royal activity in the far reaches of the Western Desert as early as the protodynastic period.

Discovery 
During the 2004 season of the North Kharga Oasis Survey (NKOS), a serekh was discovered on north-eastern face of a sandstone massif under the direction of Dr. Salima Ikram. It was isolated near the Darb Ain Amur, the ancient caravan route that connected the Kharga Oasis via the site of Umm el-Dabadib and Ain Amum to the Dakhla Oasis. The Serekh was located among other groups of graffiti with different styles and depths of cut, implying that they were from different time periods.

Serekh 
The serekh is surmounted by a falcon, as is conventional for serekhs, and contains a single sign. The sign is an arm, or A (D36 in Gardiner's sign list). This name does not correspond to any other known Early Dynastic ruler. One of the legs of the falcon reaches into the serekh, and the crouching position of the falcon is typical of serekhs from the Dynasty 0 or the First Dynasty. Thus, it would seem that the serekh contains the Horus name 'A' of a previously unattested king belonging to Dynasty 0 or the First Dynasty. Surrounding the serekh on the sandstone massif are illustrations of various animals including a crocodile, a giraffe, a hippopotamus, an ostrich, a cow or bull, and a possibly pregnant oryx.

References 

Year of birth unknown
Year of death unknown
Predynastic pharaohs